() is an indoor arena located in Mexico City, Mexico. It is within the Magdalena Mixhuca Sports City complex, near the Mexico City International Airport and in front of the Foro Sol, in which sports and artistic events are also celebrated. It is operated by Grupo CIE.  The palace is named after Mexican military official Juan Escutia, although it is rarely referred to in its full name.

The stadium was constructed for the 1968 Summer Olympics and opened in 1968.  The arena currently has 17,800 seats and can be expanded for more for non-sports events.

Construction

The  was constructed specifically for the Olympic basketball competition. There is also a smaller pavilion for expositions and concerts. 

The  was constructed  from the Olympic Village and 6.5 from downtown Mexico City in the Magdalena Mixhuca Sports City near the conflux of two expressways (Miguel Alemán Viaduct and Río Churubusco Interior Loop). It was built by the company ICA between October 15, 1966 and September 13, 1968, and finished construction just in time for the Olympics. The dome consists of hyperbolic paraboloids of tubular aluminum covered with waterproof copper-sheathed plywood and supported by huge steel arches. The  originally seated 22,370, including 7,370 in removable seats. There was parking space for 3,864 vehicles. The structure was designed by architects Félix Candela, Enrique Castañeda Tamborel and Antonio Peyri. It has three floors, which house complete facilities for athletes, judges, officials, organizers, as well as services for radio, television and the press. A mezzanine provides access to the boxes and middle and upper stands.  

The structure underwent a series of modifications in the 1990s to adjust the acoustic profile of the structure.  Earlier, the facility had acquired the derisive nickname of "" (Palace of Reverberations) due to the way sound bounced around and echoed in it, a major problem for music concerts scheduled at the arena, and a drawback even for sports events.  Various adjustments were made to compensate for these acoustic problems.

Events
The venue opened on 8 October 1968 with a performance by Maurice Béjart's Ballet of the 20th Century.

Sports
The  hosted the Mexico City Olympic Games for the 1968 basketball competition; it was also one of the three venues for the 1968 volleyball competition.  It was the home of the CBA Mexico City Aztecas (basketball) in 1994 and 1995, and the Mexico Toros of the CISL (indoor soccer) in 1995. On 6 December 1997 it hosted the NBA's regular season game between the Houston Rockets and the Dallas Mavericks, which ended with a 108-106 score.

Both the FIBA 1989 Tournament of the Americas and the 2015 FIBA Americas Championship were held at the Palace.

Concerts
A common use of the Palace is to host big expositions and rock or pop concerts. There have been more than 400 concerts held here throughout the years; a curated list of some of the most important ones is below.

References

External links

Homepage
1968 Summer Olympics official report.  Volume 2. Part 1. p. 72.
Luis Castañeda, "Image-Machine: Félix Candela's Palacio de los Deportes", article in Pidgin Magazine

Indoor arenas in Mexico
Sports venues in Mexico City
Venues of the 1968 Summer Olympics
Olympic basketball venues
Olympic volleyball venues
Dallas Mavericks
Houston Rockets
Basketball venues in Mexico
Volleyball venues in Mexico
Sports venues completed in 1968
Continental Basketball Association venues
Félix Candela buildings
1968 establishments in Mexico